The Scranton/Wilkes-Barre RailRiders (often abbreviated to SWB RailRiders) are a Minor League Baseball team of the International League (IL) and the Triple-A affiliate of the New York Yankees. They are located in Moosic, Pennsylvania, in the Scranton/Wilkes-Barre area, and are named in reference to Northeastern Pennsylvania being home to the first trolley system in the United States. The RailRiders have played their home games at PNC Field since its opening in 1989.

Founded as members of the International League in 1989, the team was known as the Scranton/Wilkes-Barre Red Barons during their affiliation with the Philadelphia Phillies from 1989 to 2006. They became known as the Scranton/Wilkes-Barre Yankees in 2007 after affiliating with the New York Yankees. They rebranded as the RailRiders in 2013. The RailRiders became members of the Triple-A East in 2021, but this league was renamed the International League in 2022.

Scranton/Wilkes-Barre has won two International League championships (2008 and 2016) and one Triple-A National Championship (2016).

History

Prior professional baseball in the Scranton/Wilkes-Barre area 
Professional baseball teams first played in the Scranton/Wilkes-Barre (SWB) area of Pennsylvania in the late 19th century. In Scranton, the predominant moniker of these teams was the Scranton Miners, who originated in 1886 as the Scranton Indians, though they were also known as Coal Heavers and Red Sox throughout their history. The Miners' last season was in 1953 as members of the Eastern League. The franchise was surrendered to the league after it was unable to secure backing by a Major League Baseball team for 1954. In Wilkes-Barre, the Wilkes-Barre Barons, originally the Coal Barons, who were established in 1886, played their last season in the Eastern League in 1955. Financial problems resulted in the relocation of the franchise to Johnstown during the 1955 season.

Scranton/Wilkes-Barre Red Barons (1989–2006) 
Over three decades after Minor League Baseball left the Scranton/Wilkes-Barre area, the Maine Phillies were relocated from Old Orchard Beach, Maine, to Lackawanna County in 1989. A group from Scranton, called Northeast Baseball, Inc. (NBI), purchased the team in 1987. The previous owner tried to renege on the sale, but after a lengthy court battle, NBI won control of the franchise and moved forward with its relocation. The team was renamed the Scranton/Wilkes-Barre Red Barons in reference to the Scranton Red Sox and the Wilkes-Barre Barons, who had preceded them. They were to play in the International League (IL) as the Triple-A affiliate of the Philadelphia Phillies, as had the franchise in Maine. Their home ballpark was the newly-constructed Lackawanna County Stadium, later renamed PNC Field, located in nearby Moosic, Pennsylvania.

The Red Barons struggled in their early years, finishing under .500 in their first three seasons. In 1992, manager Lee Elia led SWB to an 84–58 record and the Eastern Division title. In the playoffs, they defeated the Pawtucket Red Sox in the semifinals but lost the league championship versus the Columbus Clippers. The Red Barons posted losing records for the next six seasons.

Marc Bombard took over as manager in 1997 and led the club to four consecutive postseason appearances from 1999 to 2002. The 1999 Northern Division champion Red Barons were eliminated from the playoffs in the semifinals by the Charlotte Knights. In 2000, the team missed winning the division but qualified for the IL wild card spot. They defeated the Buffalo Bisons in the semifinals but fell to the Indianapolis Indians in the championship round.  Another wild card berth in 2001 sent SWB back to the playoffs. They won the semifinals over Buffalo, 3–2, and advanced to face the Louisville RiverBats for the league title. After losing Game One of the series, the postseason came to abrupt end when it was cancelled in the wake of the September 11 terrorist attacks. Louisville, with a 1–0 series lead, was declared the champion. The Red Barons returned to the playoffs in 2002 with the Northern Division title but were eliminated by Buffalo in the semifinals. They made one more postseason appearance as the Red Barons and as a Phillies affiliate in 2006 via a division title win, but the Rochester Red Wings ended their championship hopes in the semifinals.

Following the 2006 season, the Philadelphia Phillies ended their affiliation with the Red Barons and signed a player development contract with the Ottawa Lynx in anticipation of that team's move to Allentown's new Coca-Cola Park as the Lehigh Valley IronPigs for the 2008 season.

Scranton/Wilkes-Barre Yankees (2007–2012) 

In 2007, the club became the Triple-A affiliate of the New York Yankees and rebranded as the Scranton/Wilkes-Barre Yankees. In terms of regular-season records and championships, the Yankees affiliation has been more successful than that with the Phillies. From 2007 to 2009, the SWB Yankees made four consecutive trips to the postseason, all by virtue of winning the Northern Division title. The 2007 team was eliminated in the semifinal round by the Richmond Braves. In 2008, the Yankees won another division title with an 88–56 record behind manager Dave Miley. After defeating Pawtucket in the semifinals, 3–1, the Yankees beat the Durham Bulls, 3–1, in the final round to earn the Governors' Cup, their first IL championship. This qualified them for the Bricktown Showdown, a single game against the Pacific Coast League's champion to determine an overall champion of the Triple-A classification. They lost the Triple-A championship versus the Sacramento River Cats by a score of 4–1. SWB won the 2009 semifinals over the Gwinnett Braves, 3–1, but were swept by Durham in the finals, 3–0. The 2010 team was eliminated by Columbus in the semifinals. 

In November 2010, the Lackawanna County Multipurpose Stadium Authority voted to sell the SWB Yankees to Mandalay Baseball Properties, which planned a $40-million renovation of PNC Field. However, negotiations stalled the actual sale for over a year. The sale was finalized on April 26, 2012, with the franchise being sold to SWB Yankees LLC, an ownership entity that was a joint venture between the New York Yankees and Mandalay.

Empire State Yankees
The SWB Yankees chose to temporarily relocate their operations for the 2012 season to allow major renovations to PNC Field to be completed in one season, rather than being spread over two to three years. The team based itself in Rochester, New York, at Frontier Field, home of Red Wings. They played their entire schedule on the road, often being designated as the home team at an opponent's ballpark. In addition to Frontier Field, the Yankees also played home games at Dwyer Stadium in Batavia, New York; Alliance Bank Stadium in Syracuse, New York; Coca-Cola Field in Buffalo, New York; Coca-Cola Park in Allentown, Pennsylvania; and McCoy Stadium in Pawtucket, Rhode Island. The team was known as the Empire State Yankees in the 2012 season for promotional purposes, though it retained its official SWB Yankees moniker. After missing the playoffs in 2011, the Yankees returned in 2012 by winning the Northern Division title, but they were eliminated by Pawtucket in the semifinals.

Scranton/Wilkes-Barre RailRiders (2013–present) 

In anticipation of their return to the renovated PNC Field in 2013, a name-the-team contest was launched to select a new moniker for the SWB franchise. Among the finalists were "Blast", "Black Diamond Bears", "Fireflies", "Porcupines", and "Trolley Frogs". The chosen name, "RailRiders", is in reference to Northeastern Pennsylvania being home to the first trolley system in the United States. Although RailRiders received the most first-place votes by fans, Porcupines received the most overall fan votes on the ballots ranked one through three. As a result, a porcupine was incorporated in the RailRiders' logos.

The 2013 and 2014 RailRiders finished under .500 and did not qualify for the postseason. In September 2014, Mandalay Baseball Properties sold its 50% interest in the team to SWB Investors LLC for an estimated $13 to $15 million. The New York Yankees retained their 50% ownership of the team. 

The RailRiders returned to the playoffs in 2015 with a Northern Division title win, but they were swept out of the semifinals by Indianapolis. After nine seasons, six division titles, and one league championship, the 2015 season was the last for Dave Miley as the team's manager.

Al Pedrique was hired to lead the team in 2016. SWB finished with a league-best 91–52 record and another Northern Division title. They swept Lehigh Valley, 3–0, in the semifinals and won their second Governors' Cup over Gwinnett, 3–1. The IL championship qualified them for the Triple-A National Championship Game versus the El Paso Chihuahuas, where they won, 3–1, claiming their second Triple-A championship.

The 2017 RailRiders won the division title and defeated Lehigh Valley in the semifinals but lost the IL championship to Durham. The 2018 club made another postseason run via a wild card berth. Like in the previous season, they advanced to the finals by beating Lehigh Valley but again lost in the finals to Durham. The RailRiders finished the 2019 season tied for first place with the Syracuse Mets, each with a 75–65 record. On September 3, SWB defeated Syracuse in a one-game playoff, 14–13, to win the Northern Division title. They were, however, swept in the playoff semifinals by Durham. 

The start of the 2020 season was initially postponed due to the COVID-19 pandemic before being cancelled altogether.

In conjunction with Major League Baseball's restructuring of Minor League Baseball in 2021, the RailRiders were organized into the Triple-A East. No playoffs were held to determine a league champion; instead, the team with the best regular-season record was declared the winner. SWB placed third in the league standings with a 68–49 record under manager Doug Davis, who had been with the club as a coach since 2017. However, 10 games that had been postponed from the start of the season were reinserted into the schedule as a postseason tournament called the Triple-A Final Stretch in which all 30 Triple-A clubs competed for the highest winning percentage. The RailRiders finished the tournament in sixth place with a 7–3 record. 

In 2022, the Triple-A East became known as the International League, the name historically used by the regional circuit prior to the 2021 reorganization. Davis returned to the club for his second season as manager, leading the team to an 83–67 record, finishing second in the ten-team East Division.

Season-by-season records

Uniforms

The RailRiders' primary home uniform is white with navy blue pinstripes, mirroring those of the New York Yankees. The primary home jersey features a descending "SWB" logo on train tracks on the left chest and a navy interlocking New York Yankees "NY" logo on the right sleeve. The home cap is navy with a golden "R" set against a railroad track. The team's road uniform is gray with "RailRiders" across the jersey's chest and is worn with a navy cap with a white interlocking "SWB" logo.

An alternate solid navy jersey was introduced in 2022, featuring the white interlocking "SWB" crest on the left chest and a white interlocking New York Yankees "NY" logo on the right sleeve. These are worn with the navy cap feature the same "SWB" logo.

Radio and television

SWB's first radio play-by-play announcer was Kent Westling, a former local television sportscaster who previously worked on telecasts of the St. Louis Blues hockey team. While cutting back on his schedule in later years, he retired following the 2007 season after having called over 2,000 games since the team's inaugural 1989 campaign. Mike Vander Woude served as the team's second play-by-play announcer from 2008 until 2012. He was followed by John Sadak from 2013 to 2017.  Adam Marco has been the "Voice of the RailRiders" since 2018.

All RailRiders home and road games are broadcast by WICK across their five frequencies in Northeastern Pennsylvania: 1400 WICK (Lackawanna and Luzerne Counties), 1440 WCDL (Lackawanna County and Pocono Lake Region), 93.5 FM (Scranton and Northern Lackawanna County), 106.7 FM (Wayne and Pike Counties), and 107.9 FM (Lackawanna County). Live audio broadcasts are also available online through the team's website and the MiLB First Pitch app. All home and road games can be viewed through the MiLB.TV subscription feature of the official website of Minor League Baseball, with audio provided by a radio simulcast.

Roster

Awards 

Eight players, five managers, and two executives have won league awards in recognition for their performance with Scranton/Wilkes-Barre in the International League.

Managers

Scranton/Wilkes-Barre has had 17 managers since their inaugural 1989 season.

Ownership
The Scranton/Wilkes-Barre RailRiders are owned by Diamond Baseball Holdings, a subsidiary of the investment firm Silver Lake, previously a subsidiary of Endeavor Group Holdings.

Prior to the Diamond Baseball Holdings ownership, the Railriders were owned by SWB Yankees LLC, a joint venture between Yankee Global Enterprises and SWB Investors LLC and was previously a joint venture between Yankee Global Enterprises and Mandalay Baseball Properties until Mandalay sold its stake in SWB Yankees LLC to SWB Investors LLC. Yankee Global Enterprises is the owner of the RailRiders' parent club the New York Yankees and SWB Investors LLC was the local ownership group that handled the day-to-day operations of the RailRiders. The joint venture's name comes from the name SWB Yankees, an alternate name that was used by the RailRiders when they were known as the Scranton/Wilkes-Barre Yankees to distinguish themselves from their MLB affiliate, the New York Yankees. Yankee Global Enterprises and SWB Investors LLC each owned 50% in the SWB Yankees LLC joint venture, automatically gave each 50% ownership in the RailRiders. SWB Investors LLC's 50% stake in the SWB Yankees LLC joint venture was originally held by Mandalay Baseball Properties. Former MLB pitcher Andy Ashby was one of the team's owner-investors.

Notes

References

External links

 
 Statistics from Baseball-Reference

1989 establishments in Pennsylvania
Baseball teams established in 1989
International League teams
Lackawanna County, Pennsylvania
Luzerne County, Pennsylvania
New York Yankees minor league affiliates
Philadelphia Phillies minor league affiliates
Professional baseball teams in Pennsylvania
Sports in the Scranton–Wilkes-Barre metropolitan area
Triple-A East teams
Yankee Global Enterprises